Francesco Bennici (born 3 October 1971) is a former Italian long-distance runner who competed at the 1992 Summer Olympics.

Biography
He won two medals at senior level at the International athletics competitions. He also was the only medal for Italy at 1990 World Junior Championships in Athletics.

References

External links
 

1971 births
Living people
Athletes (track and field) at the 1992 Summer Olympics
Italian male long-distance runners
Italian male marathon runners
Olympic athletes of Italy
Athletics competitors of Gruppo Sportivo Esercito
Mediterranean Games silver medalists for Italy
Mediterranean Games medalists in athletics
Athletes (track and field) at the 1991 Mediterranean Games